Je te donne (English: I give to you) is an album by Léo Ferré released in 1976 by CBS Records.

History

Track listing
All songs written, composed, arranged and directed by Léo Ferré, except Coriolan, composed by Ludwig van Beethoven.

Original LP

Personnel 
 Milan Symphonic Orchestra

Production 
 Arranger & conductor: Léo Ferré
 Engineering: Davide Marinone
 Executive producer: Detto Mariano

External links 
 Album listening & presentation (French)

Léo Ferré albums
French-language albums
CBS Disques albums
1976 albums